Slovenske Konjice ( or ; , in older sources also Gannobitz) is a town in northeastern Slovenia. It is the seat of the Municipality of Slovenske Konjice. The area is part of the traditional region of Styria.

History and town sights
The town of Slovenske Konjice lies below the northern slopes of Mount Konjice and the winegrowing Škalce Hills. On a hill above the town to the southwest are the ruins of 12th-century Gonobitz Castle, which has later additions and was abandoned in the 18th century. Its ruins have been partially restored.

Above Old Square stands the medieval Trebnik Mansion. The more than 860-year-old dense town line is a sloping square, from Trebnik Mansion past St. George's parish church, along a small stream in an open channel, down to the Dravinja River. The new Town Square (Mestni trg) is on the other bank of the river, connected with Old Square by a bridge with four horse heads on the corners.

The dominant structure in the upper part of the town's medieval core is the parish church dedicated to Saint George and belonging to the Roman Catholic Archdiocese of Maribor, dating back to the late 13th century with 18th-century additions (a Baroque side chapel). The veneration of the saint at this place goes even further back in history. The town was mentioned in written sources dating to 1165 as a seminal parish. The castle was first mentioned in 1148 and the market town in 1236. The town itself was not surrounded by walls. At the time of the Ottoman raids, the church with its vicarage served as a fortified refuge. A second church in the settlement is dedicated to Saint Anne. It dates to the mid-16th century with a 17th-century belfry and Baroque additions.

The main street and the transversal connections above the Dravinja are lined with longitudinal or transversally positioned one-storey houses with well-preserved Gothic cores and Renaissance additions. The façades were restyled in the 19th century (Biedermeier, Historicism). A rarity is the Art Nouveau building of the former savings bank. A Marian column dating to the mid-18th century and a column shrine dedicated to Saint Florian above the stream (both designed by the local artist Franc Zamlik in 1750) dominate the open square. The town core is well preserved.

Slovenske Konjice played a role during the Slovenian peasant revolt of 1515, with rebels here composing a letter with their demands to send to the emperor in Vienna. Economic development was boosted after construction of main Vienna to Trieste road in the 18th century. During the 19th century the town got a local court. On 20 June 1892, work started on a narrow gauge (760 mm) steam railroad line called Konjičanka from Poljčane to Slovenske Konjice, which was opened on 20 December 1892. On 29 June 1921 it was extended to Zreče. It was closed in 1963, and the tracks were removed in 1970. A museum locomotive K.3 (Gonobitz), built by the Krauss factory at Linz and used on this line, is on display at the Slovenian Railway Museum in Ljubljana.

Name
Over the centuries, the name Konjice appears in written documents in various forms: Gonviz (1251), Gombicz (1370), Gannabitz (1570), Gonaviz (1594), Gonavitz (1630), Gonwitz (1636), Gonowitz (1662), Ganowiz (1680), Gonnawitz (1680), and modern German Gonobitz. The adjective Slovenske was added to the Slovene name Konjice in 1934, under the Kingdom of Yugoslavia, in order to distinguish it from the town of Konjic in Bosnia and Herzegovina.

Monuments

Konjice Castle
Trebnik Mansion
 Vineyard Mansion at Škalce
 St. George parish church
 St. Anna Cemetery church
Žiče Charterhouse

Owners of the castle
 house of Gonobitz 1148–1329
 house of Wilthausen 1329–1385
 house of Duino 1385–1406
 lords of Walsee 1406–1469
 regional princes 1496–1576
 Johann von Khißl 1576–1592
 Archduke Ferdinand 1594–1597
 counts Tattenbach 1597–1670
 Holy Roman Emperor 1670–1685
 Johann and Otto Tattenbach 1685–1692
 Žiče Charterhouse 1692–1783
 Imperial Religious Fund (Religionsfond) 1783–1828
 princes of Windisch-Grätz 1828–1945

Geography

Climate

Tourism

 Slovenske Konjice, formerly nicknamed "The Town of Wine and Flowers", won the Pan-European Entente Florale Gold Medal Award in 1998 and 2014.
 The traditional St. George festival (Jurjevanje) ranks Slovenske Konjice among Europe's Carnival Cities.

The town has been rewarded for its efforts with the national "Most Beautiful Excursion Destination" award by the Tourist Association of Slovenia for many years in a row.

Culture 
The town of Slovenske Konjice hosts an international festival of underwater film and photography named "Sprehodi pod morjem" (Walking beneath the Sea), which is held every year at the end of January (on the last Thursday of the month).

Sport 

 ND Dravinja Football club

Sport events 
 Grand Prix Slovenia International Boxing Competition
 Konjice (mini) Marathon (Konjiški maraton)

Notable people
Notable people that were born or lived in Slovenske Konjice include:
 Konrad von Hebenstreit (died 1412), archbishop of Freising
 Ivan Minatti (1924–2012), Slovene poet
 Branko Rudolf (1904–1987), Slovene writer
 Adelma Vay (1840–1925), writer, medium, and pioneer of Spiritualism
 Jure Zdovc (born 1966), Slovene basketball player and coach
 Tamara Zidanšek (born 1997), Slovene tennis player

International relations

Twin towns – sister cities

Slovenske Konjice is twinned with:

International projects and other forms of cooperation

References

External links
 The official travel guide to Slovenia
 Slovenske Konjice video on YouTube
 Slovenske Konjice on Geopedia
 Association of Historical cities of Slovenia: Towns of Culture
 Walking beneath the Sea Film festival

Populated places in the Municipality of Slovenske Konjice
Cities and towns in Styria (Slovenia)